Legends of Chima is a computer-animated television series created by Tommy Andreasen and produced by The Lego Group. It was created to coincide with the Lego Legends of Chima line of construction toys. It centres on the fictional world of Chima, a place inhabited by warring tribes of anthropomorphic animals. The series broadcast on Cartoon Network in the United States. It began with two episodes that aired on January 16, 2013, with the Season 1 finale airing on December 5, 2013. On March 15, 2014, Season 2 premiered on Cartoon Network and ended on April 19 of the same year. Season 3 aired on August 9 and ended on November 22, 2014.

Plot
Chima is a pristine realm filled with tribes consisting of various anthropomorphic animals.

Season 1: Power of the Chi
When young Prince Cragger loses his parents in the Gorge of Eternal Depth and becomes king of the Crocodile Tribe, his sister Crooler uses Persuader Plants to force him to do whatever she wants (mostly destroy the Lions). His former best friend, Prince Laval of the Lion Tribe, becomes his worst enemy. Thus, a terrible war breaks out between the eight animal tribes over the powerful Chi, a substance that can both sustain life and destroy it. Before the final battle a black cloud stops the Chi falls making Cragger blame Laval for it. At the final battle, since Crooler has run out of Persuader Plants and Laval fakes his death, Cragger is emotionally moved and apologizes for everything he has done. It is revealed that Laval faked his death to find the Crocodile Legend Beast, along with Cragger's mother.

Season 2: Quest for the Legend Beasts
When the Crawlers use the advantages of the war for the Chi to steal the Chi from Mount Cavora by blocking the falls, the eight heroes of Chima must travel to the Outlands to rescue the eight Legend Beasts, which are the keys to restarting Mount Cavora. After the defeat of the Crawlers, the legend beasts enter Mount Cavora and Chima becomes a peaceful land again, meanwhile, in the scorpion cave, King Storm, leader of the Scorpion tribe and the Crawler, is angry at Laval for giving him chi and blames it for their miserly and then responds by throwing the chi to another gorge but not before realizing another ancient threat has awakened a long slumber.

Season 3: Legend of the Fire Chi
As a threat of the Ancient Hunter Tribes emerge, the heroes of Chima must find the legendary Fire tribes and unlock the new Fire chi power to turn up the heat and stop the Ice tribes from freezing all of Chima. Towards the end of the battles with the Hunter Tribes, the heroes begin their quest for the 8 (technically 9) Fire Wings, the only things powerful enough to stop the Hunter Tribes. The heroes eventually find all 9 and spark another Great Illumination. Because of this, everything is fixed. The lands are no longer covered in ice and even the Hunter Tribes were healed of their rotting flesh as well as the corruption in their hearts. Chima, once again, becomes a peaceful land without the threat from other dangerous species. The final scene of episode 41 reveals that Chima is a realm of a giant floating island hovering above on an even larger unknown world.

Episodes

Season 1: Power of the Chi (2013)

Season 2: Quest for the Legend Beasts (2014)

Season 3: Legend of the Fire Chi (2014)

Mini movies 
A series of mini movies of extra adventures in the land of Chima were uploaded on the Lego website and YouTube channel. A selection of them appeared on special Season 1 Part 1 DVD releases.

Background and production

Development 
Legends of Chima was produced by M2Film, an animation studio in Denmark. The supervising producer was Ole Holm Christensen. Each episode consists of 22 minutes. The production involved a team of 300 that were based in various locations including Denmark, Paris, Barcelona, Amsterdam, Vancouver, Los Angeles, Mumbai and Bangkok. Christensen commented, "Our designers, art directors, animators, everyone couldn't wait to sink their teeth into the project. Our art team, which is spread out all over the world, created lots of concept art of the series. The goal was to create something special that, at least in our view, was unique and hadn't been seen before on television." The artists took their inspiration from a wide variety of sources, including "many different elements of pop culture". The demands of the animation required a Maya-based CG pipeline and heavy render farms, with each episode taking about 12 weeks to produce. The Chima characters were animated to resemble the shiny plastic surfaces of Lego minifigures, rather than recreating animal fur.

In 2021, the co-creator of Lego Ninjago Tommy Andreasen revealed unseen concept art for Legends of Chima on Twitter, detailing what the theme could have been had it taken a different path. Tommy Andreasen explained, "This is a concept film was made to explain Legends of Chima's ending internally. The search for the Fire Wings was intended to be a 6 episode arc which would also have introduced Florax, Flinx's mother, chief botanist of Chima, but plans were revised."

Writing 
The storyline was written by Los Angeles-based writer John Derevlany. He commented, "Usually things get dramatically scaled back for production reasons. In the case of Legends of Chima, everything got even more epic. I think the show is quite special because it tells simple children’s stories set against incredible action scenes and a very deep, immersive mythology."

Cast
David Attar - Cragger, Lennox, Rogon, Ripnik, Reegull, Stealthor
Bethany Brown - Eris, Crooler, Spinlyn, Rinona, Wonald
Matt Cronander - Willhurt, Ewar, Elon
Bill Courage - Crominus, Lagravis, Longtooth, Lavertus, Mottrot
Chris Durchand - Dom De La Woosh, Sir Fangar, Strainor
Jesse Inocalla - Plovar, Grumlo, Runk, Sparracon, Fluminox
Meghan Kinsley - Crunket, G'Loona, Windra, Li'ella, Maula
John Nelson - Wakz, Crug, Balkar, Rukus, Flinx
Michael Patric - Gorzan, Scorm, Mungus, Voom Voom, Eglor
Scott Shantz - Laval, Worriz, Skinnet, Furtivo, Razcal, Sparratus, Scolder, Scutter, Lundor, Vardy, Firox
Jeff Evans Todd - Razar, Bladvic, Crawley, Winzar, Leonidas, Equila, Ewald
Adam White - Foltrax, Vornon
Dave Pettitt - Tormak

Crew
Doug Parker - Voice Director

Reception

Critical reception 
On 9 July 2013, Brian Lowry for Variety commented that Legends of Chima is, "an elaborate hodge-podge culled from a half-dozen familiar properties — including the Force-like powers Laval's dad possesses and the hovering vehicles upon which characters zoom around — and appears to exist for no other reason than to sell brightly hued little action figures." Emily Ashby for Common Sense Media gave the series a four out of five star rating and commented, "Legends of Chima is a thoughtful, beautifully designed animated series that exceeds expectations for a story designed to sell accompanying toys. From the characters' complicated relationships to the mysticism behind the evolution of the talking animal species, this is far more than a one-dimensional tale meant to merely fill kids' time. Instead it explores friendship, trust, loyalty, and honesty against a backdrop of conflict that's mild enough to appeal to grade schoolers (and their parents)."

Ratings
The series premiere was watched by 1.5 million viewers, making it the 10th highest rated show overall on cable that night.

Awards

Soundtrack
The music for Legends of Chima was written by Danish composer Anthony Lledo who had worked together with Peder Pedersen on the director's Indiana Jones and Star Wars themed Lego shorts. The music was awarded the 2013 Cue Award for Best Television Score and has been released on two soundtrack albums by MovieScore Media.

Legends of Chima (Released 2013)

Legends of Chima Vol. 2 (Released 2015)

See also 

 Ninjago (TV series)
 Nexo Knights

References

Bibliography
 Eris to the Rescue. Authored by Marilyn Easton. Published by Turtleback Books, 2013. 
 LEGO (R) Legends of Chima Brickmaster the Quest for CHI. Published by Dorling Kindersley, 2013. 
 Lego Legends of Chima: Tribes of Chima. Authored by Ruth Amos. Published by Dorling Kindersley, 2013. 
 Lego Legends of Chima: The Race for Chi. Authored by Ruth Amos. Published by Dorling Kindersley, 2013. 
 LEGO Legends of Chima Official Annual 2014. Published by Penguin Books Ltd., 2013. 
 LEGO (R) Legends of Chima Ultimate Sticker Collection. Published by Dorling Kindersley, 2013. 
 LEGO Legends of Chima: Wolves and Crocodiles Activity Book with Minifigure. Published by Penguin Random House Children's UK, 2013. 
 Gorillas Gone Bananas. Authored by Greg Farshtey. Published by Scholastic Inc., 2013. 
 Lego(r) Legends of Chima: Attack of the Crocodiles (Chapter Book #1). Authored by Greg Farshtey. Published by Scholastic Inc., 2013. 
 Lego Legends of Chima: Beware of the Wolves (Chapter Book #2). Authored by Greg Farshtey. Published by Scholastic Inc., 2013. 
 Lego Legends of Chima: Danger in the Outlands (Chapter Book #5). Authored by Greg Farshtey. Published by Scholastic Inc., 2014. 
 LEGO (R) Legends of Chima Character Encyclopedia. Published by Dorling Kindersley, 2014. 
 How to Draw Heroes and Villains. Authored by Ron Zalme. Published by Scholastic Inc., 2014. 
 Lego: Legends of Chima Official Guide with Figurine. Authored by Tracey West. Published by Scholastic Inc., 2014. 
 Lego Legends of Chima: Heroes' Quest. Authored by Heather Seabrook. Published by Dorling Kindersley, 2014. 
 LEGO (R) Legends of Chima Ultimate Factivity Collection. Published by Dorling Kindersley, 2014. 
 Lego Legends of Chima: Ravens and Gorillas (Activity Book #3). Published by Scholastic Inc., 2014. 
 Lego Legends of Chima: Character Encyclopedia. Authored by Beth Landis Hester and Heather Seabrook. Published by Dorling Kindersley, 2014. 
 Lego Legends of Chima: Character Encyclopedia (Library Edition). Authored by Beth Landis Hester. Published by Dorling Kindersley, 2014. 
 Lego Legends of Chima: Power Up!. Authored by Julia March. Published by Dorling Kindersley, 2015.

External links

Lego Legends of Chima
Lego television series
2013 Canadian television series debuts
2014 Canadian television series endings
2010s Canadian animated television series
2013 Danish television series debuts
2014 Danish television series endings
2010s Danish television series
Canadian children's animated action television series
Canadian children's animated adventure television series
Canadian children's animated fantasy television series
Danish children's animated action television series
Danish children's animated adventure television series
Danish children's animated fantasy television series
Anime-influenced Western animated television series
Canadian computer-animated television series